Distylium (winter-hazel) is a genus of about 18 species of evergreen shrubs and trees in the witch hazel family, Hamamelidaceae, native to eastern and southeastern Asia.

Taxonomy

Fossil record
Researchers have recognized Distylium fossil pollen among the middle Miocene Sarmatian palynoflora from the Lavanttal Basin of Austria. The sediment containing the fossil pollen had accumulated in a lowland wetland environment with various vegetation units of mixed evergreen/deciduous broadleaved/conifer forests surrounding the wetland basin. Key relatives of the fossil taxa found with Distylium are presently confined to humid warm temperate environments, suggesting a subtropical climate during the middle Miocene in Austria. Distylium macrofossils of the Lower and Middle Miocene, are known from the lignite mines of the Kaltennortheim Formation in the Rhön Mountains, central Germany, where it is associated with typical elements of the Mastixioid floras that attest to an optimal warm humid phase of the Miocene.

Species
Selected species
Distylium buxifolium - China
Distylium chinense - China
Distylium chungii - China
Distylium cuspidatum - China
Distylium dunnianum - China
Distylium elaeagnoides - China
Distylium gracile - China
Distylium macrophyllum - China
Distylium myricoides - China
Distylium pingpienense - China
Distylium racemosum - tree up to 20m; China, Korea, Japan (Ryukyu Islands)(known as Isunoki(イスノキ)/Nara(柞), Taiwan
Distylium tsiangii - China

References

Flora of China: Distylium

External links
 

Hamamelidaceae
Saxifragales genera